Petersaurach is a municipality  in the district of Ansbach in Bavaria in Germany.

References

External links
 

Wetter Petersaurach

Ansbach (district)